Stadionul Călărăşăuca is a multi-use stadium in Călărășeuca, Moldova.  It is used mostly for football matches and is the home ground of FC Nistru Otaci.  The stadium holds 2,000 people.

References

External links
Photo gallery

Football venues in Moldova